Mentzelia pectinata is a species of flowering plant in the family Loasaceae known by the common name San Joaquin blazingstar.

Distribution
It is endemic to California, where it grows in the hills and mountains on either side of the San Joaquin Valley, including the Temblor Range, the Tehachapi Mountains, and the southern Sierra Nevada. It grows on grassy slopes, woodlands, and other local habitat.

Description 
Mentzelia pectinata is an annual herb producing an erect, green stem up to about half a meter tall. The leaves are up to 12 centimeters long in the basal rosette and divided into comblike lobes, and those higher on the stem are reduced in size.

The inflorescence is a cluster of flowers with orange to yellow petals up to 2 centimeters long and often marked with red near the bases. At the center of the flower are many whiskery stamens. The fruit is a narrow, straight utricle up to 3.5 centimeters long which contains many tiny, angular seeds.

External links
Calflora Database: Mentzelia pectinata (San Joaquin blazing star,  San Joaquin blazingstar)
Jepson Manual eFlora (TJM2) treatment of Mentzelia pectinata
UC Photos gallery — Mentzelia pectinata

pectinata
Endemic flora of California
Flora of the Sierra Nevada (United States)
Natural history of the California chaparral and woodlands
Natural history of the California Coast Ranges
Natural history of the Central Valley (California)
Natural history of the Transverse Ranges
~
Taxa named by Albert Kellogg
Flora without expected TNC conservation status